Prunus jenkinsii, called thereju and bonthereju,, is a species of Prunus native to the foothills of the Himalayas, preferring to grow at 1000–1800m. It is a tree typically 7–20m tall, flowering in autumn and fruiting in winter and spring. Its hard but edible dark brown fruit is harvested and brought to market in areas of India where it grows. Some sources even consider it to be cultivated or semidomesticated.

References

External links
 

jenkinsii
Flora of Assam (region)
Flora of Bangladesh
Flora of East Himalaya
Flora of Myanmar
Flora of South-Central China
Plants described in 1878